HMS Sparrowhawk was a B-class torpedo boat destroyer of the Royal Navy. She was completed by Laird, Son & Company, Birkenhead, and was launched on 8 October 1895. She served on the China Station and was wrecked in the mouth of the Yangtze River in 1904.  She was one of four Quail-class destroyers.

Design and construction
HMS Sparrowhawk was the second of four 30-knot destroyers ordered from Laird's as part of the 1894–1895 Royal Navy shipbuilding programme. As with other early Royal Navy destroyers, the detailed design was left to the builder, with the Admiralty laying down only broad requirements.

Displacement was  light and  full load, while crew was 63. Armament consisted of a QF 12 pounder 12 cwt ( calibre) gun on a platform on the ship's conning tower (in practice the platform was also used as the ship's bridge), with a secondary armament of five 6-pounder guns, and two 18-inch (450 mm) torpedo tubes.

Sparrowhawk was laid down as Yard No 607 on 30 May 1895, and was launched on 8 October 1895. Sparrowhawk commissioned in June 1897.

Service
Newly commissioned, Sparrowhawk took part in the naval review off Spithead on 26 June 1897 to celebrate the Diamond Jubilee of Queen Victoria. Laird's thirty-knotters were considered strongly built ships and good seaboats, suitable for deployment on overseas stations, and so Sparrowhawk and sister ship  were deployed to the Pacific Station in 1897, being based at Esquimault, British Columbia, Canada.

Sparrowhawk was later deployed to the China Station. On 17 June 1904, Sparrowhawk struck an uncharted rock off the mouth of the Yangtze river during fleet exercises. While all the crew survived, attempts by the battleship  to recover the stricken destroyer failed, and Sparrowhawk sank.

References

Bibliography

 

 

Quail-class destroyers
Ships built on the River Mersey
1895 ships
B-class destroyers (1913)
Maritime incidents in 1904
Shipwrecks of China
Shipwrecks in the East China Sea